The Women’s 50 metre freestyle at the 2014 IPC Swimming European Championships was held at the Pieter van den Hoogenband Swimming Stadium, in Eindhoven from 4–10 August.

Medallists

See also
List of IPC world records in swimming

References

freestyle 50 m women
2014 in women's swimming